Crataegus putnamiana is a rare species of North American hawthorn derived from hybridization between a species in Crataegus series Coccineae and a species in series Dilatatae.

References

puntnamiana
Flora of North America